Bennent is a surname. Notable people with the surname include:

Heinz Bennent (1921–2011), German actor
David Bennent (born 1966), Swiss actor